Yam Naem is a Thai food name. It may refer to:
Yam naem khao thot,  a snack dish made with crumbled, crispy-fried curried rice balls
Yam naem sot, a type of yam Thai salad